Northern University High School was a small high school in Cedar Falls, Iowa, United States, run by the University of Northern Iowa. It comprised grades 9-12 of the Pk-12 Malcolm Price Laboratory School. It closed in July 2012 under controversy and university budget cuts, and was mostly demolished in June 2013, save for the athletics Wing, part of which was re-purposed into the UNI Childhood Development center, previously housed in the building's east wing.

Athletics
The school won the 2008 IHSAA boys' Class 1A basketball championship tournament, the 2008 IHSAA boys' class 1A golf tournament, the 2010 IHSAA boys' Class 1A cross country championship, and two Iowa School of Character awards (2007 and 2008).

In earlier years, the school was known for football, for 21 years under coach John Aldrich (1955–1976). Playing the single-wing offense, the team compiled a 120–49 record under Coach Aldrich, who was a member of the Iowa High School Coaches Hall of Fame.

Information Technology 
Northern University won multiple Information Technology competitions in the Cyber Defense category.  In 2008, 2009, 2010, and 2011 the school won first place in the Cyber Defense category of the IT-Olympics held at Iowa State University.

Fine arts
Despite its small size, students from Northern University High School were consistently accepted into the Iowa All State Orchestra, Band and Choir.

Scandal
The school became a subject of controversy in July 2009 after local media agencies reported that nine families had defrauded the school in order to receive discounted tuition. One person implicated in this scandal is Iowa State Representative Kerry Burt.

Notable alumni

 Trev Alberts, American football player
 Annabeth Gish, American actress
 Vivek Goyal, American engineering professor, author, and inventor
 Gary Kroeger, American actor
 Ras Smith, American politician

References

1954 establishments in Iowa
2012 disestablishments in Iowa
Buildings and structures in Cedar Falls, Iowa
Educational institutions disestablished in 2012
Educational institutions established in 1954
Public high schools in Iowa
Public middle schools in Iowa
Schools in Black Hawk County, Iowa